Lucius Harwood Foote (April 10, 1826 – June 4, 1913) was the first American minister to Korea and served from 1883-1885.

Early life
Lucius Foote was born April 10, 1826, in Winfield, New York to Rev. Lucius Foote and Electa Harwood.  He married in 1862 to Rose Frost Carter (d. 1885).

Pre-Korea years
Lucius Foote was the Adjutant General of the California National Guard, from December 21, 1871 – December 13, 1875.

U.S. Ambassador to Korea
In May 1882, Korea and the United States signed  a treaty of commerce, in Chemulpo Port (modern day Incheon). This treaty required an American political presence in Korea. Foote was assigned a year later, with the title, "Envoy Extraordinary and Minister Plenipotentiary". However, due to low trade volumes, in July 1884, Foote was demoted to the position of "Minister Resident". In August 1884, he purchased a hanok-style house, from the Min family and thus established the American Legation. He shared the building with Horace Newton Allen. When Lucius Foote resigned and left Seoul, in January 1885, George Clayton Foulk replaced him.

Later years
Lucius Foote retired to San Francisco, California.

He died there on June 4, 1913.

References

External links
 Political Graveyard

1826 births
1913 deaths
19th-century American diplomats
Ambassadors of the United States to Korea